South Wayne Historic District is a national historic district located at Fort Wayne, Indiana.  The district encompasses 133 contributing buildings and 1 contributing structure in a predominantly residential section of Fort Wayne. The area was developed between about 1893 and 1940, and includes notable examples of Colonial Revival, American Four Square, and Bungalow / American Craftsman style residential architecture.

It was listed on the National Register of Historic Places in 1992.

References

Houses on the National Register of Historic Places in Indiana
Historic districts on the National Register of Historic Places in Indiana
Colonial Revival architecture in Indiana
National Register of Historic Places in Fort Wayne, Indiana
Houses in Fort Wayne, Indiana